The Women's 4×100 Freestyle Relay event at the 11th FINA World Aquatics Championships swam on 24 July 2005 in Montreal Canada.

At the start of the event, the existing World (WR) and Championships (CR) records were:
WR: 3:35.94 swum by Australia on 14 August 2004 in Athens, Greece
CR: 3:37.91 swum by China on 7 September 1994 in Rome, Italy

Results

Final

Preliminaries

References

Swimming at the 2005 World Aquatics Championships
2005 in women's swimming